KCAL (1410 kHz) is a commercial AM radio station licensed to Redlands, California, and serving the Riverside-San Bernardino-Inland Empire radio market.  It is owned by Lazer Broadcasting, with studios and offices in San Bernardino.  Lazer owns a number of small Spanish language outlets throughout Southern California.  There is also a KCAL-FM at 96.7 MHz and KCAL-TV 9, but they are not connected with AM 1410 KCAL.

Although most of its programming is in Spanish as "La Mejor," KCAL does air the games of the Rancho Cucamonga Quakes of the California League (Minor League Baseball) in English. The rest of KCAL's schedule consists of Spanish-language programming, with a Classic Regional Mexican radio format.

History
The station signed on in 1961 on 960 AM before moving to 1410 AM.  It added an FM station at 96.7 MHz in the 1970s.  KCAL had a Top 40 format from the 1960s to the 1990s, and was the leading radio station in the Inland Empire in the 1970s and 1980s. 

On October 28, 2015, KCAL was granted a Federal Communications Commission construction permit to change the community of license to Grand Terrace, decrease day power to 3,000 watts, decrease night power to 2,200 watts and move the transmitter site to a diplex at KKDD in San Bernardino.  The construction permit expired unbuilt in 2018.

References

External links
Radio Lazer Website

CAL
Mass media in the Inland Empire
Redlands, California
Mass media in Riverside, California
Mass media in San Bernardino, California
Mass media in Riverside County, California
Mass media in San Bernardino County, California
CAL
Radio stations established in 1961
1961 establishments in California